Lachlan McNeil may refer to:

 Lachlan McNeil (Australian rules footballer)
 Lachlan McNeil (wrestler)